Clidophleps is a genus of cicadas in the family Cicadidae. There are about eight described species in Clidophleps.

Species
These eight species belong to the genus Clidophleps:
 Clidophleps astigma Davis, 1917
 Clidophleps beameri Davis, 1936
 Clidophleps blaisdellii (Uhler, 1892)
 Clidophleps distanti (Van Duzee, 1914)
 Clidophleps rotundifrons (Davis, 1916)
 Clidophleps tenuis Davis, 1927
 Clidophleps vagans Davis, 1925
 Clidophleps wrighti Davis, 1926

References

Further reading

 
 
 
 
 
 
 

Articles created by Qbugbot
Tibicinini
Cicadidae genera